Kuydusun (Kuyduhun) is a rural locality (a selo) in Borogonsky 2-y Rural Okrug of Oymyakonsky District in the Sakha Republic, Russia, located  from Ust-Nera, the administrative center of the district, and  from Tomtor, the administrative center of the rural okrug. Its population as of the 2002 Census was 139.

Geography 
The village is located on the left bank of the Kuydusun, a tributary of the Indigirka. There is a bridge over the river east of the village.

References

Notes

Sources
Official website of the Sakha Republic. Registry of the Administrative-Territorial Divisions of the Sakha Republic. Oymyakonsky District. 

Rural localities in Oymyakonsky District